Mendota Consolidated Community School District 289 is a school district in Mendota, Illinois.

It has Blackstone School (Kindergarten-grade 1), Lincoln School (grades 2–4), and Northbrook School (grades 5–8).

References

External links

Mendota Consolidated Community School District 289 (Archive)

School districts in Illinois
Mendota, Illinois
Education in LaSalle County, Illinois